The Mowry Bluff Archeological Site, in Frontier County, Nebraska, near Cambridge, Nebraska, is a  archeological site that was listed on the National Register of Historic Places in 1974.  Its Smithsonian trinomial designation is 25 FT 35.  It is a village site that was listed for its information potential. 

A "house mound" at the site was explored, and the site was described, by archeologist W. Raymond Wood, of the University of Missouri, before 1970. The Mowry site is one of many in the watershed of Medicine Creek.

References

External links 
More photos of the Mowry Bluff archaeological site at Wikimedia Commons

Archaeological sites on the National Register of Historic Places in Nebraska
Frontier County, Nebraska
National Register of Historic Places in Frontier County, Nebraska